Pix Transmissions Ltd (PTL) is an Indian manufacturer of belts and related mechanical transmission products. Headquartered in Mumbai, Maharashtra, the company has manufacturing facilities in Hingna and Nagalwadi, Nagpur.

In 2021, PTL reported consolidated revenue of INR 4 billion. The company has also listed in the Bombay Stock Exchange in the year 1989.

History 
PTL started its operations in 1981 in Nagpur, Maharashtra. In 1999, the company established a new manufacturing facility and began production of Timing, Raw Edge Cogged, and Poly-V Belts. 

The company has manufacturing units in Hingna and Nagalwadi, Nagpur. The Nagalwadi facility is an automated polymer mixing facility.

PTL commenced operations in the UK, Germany, and UAE by establishing subsidiaries and joint ventures, such as PIX Europe Limited, PIX Germany GmbH, and PIX Middle East Trading LLC.

In 2021, the company announced its foray into the automotive segment with the launch of PIX Force.

R&D facilities 
The company has its R&D centers located at Nagalwadi Plant, Nagpur.

 Plant I: Hingna MIDC
 Plant II: TRP plant, Nagalwadi, Nagpur 
 Plant III: MEC plant, Nagalwadi, Nagpur 
 Plant IV: Pix logistics hub

Awards and achievements 

 Export Promotion Council Govt. of India
 Niryat Shree Award from the president of India

References

External links 

 
 

Companies based in Maharashtra
Manufacturing companies based in Mumbai
Manufacturing companies established in 1981
Indian companies established in 1981
Indian brands
Companies listed on the Bombay Stock Exchange